Bedford Historic District may refer to:

Bedford Historic District (Bedford, Ohio), listed on the National Register of Historic Places in Cuyahoga County, Ohio
Bedford Historic District (Bedford, Pennsylvania), listed on the National Register of Historic Places in Bedford County, Pennsylvania
Bedford Historic District (Bedford, Virginia), listed on the National Register of Historic Places in Bedford County, Virginia
 Bedford Historic District (Brooklyn), designated by the New York City Landmarks Preservation Commission on December 8, 2015
 Bedford Village Historic District, New York